Rafael de Mestre (born 1 February 1963, Manresa) is a Spanish IT consultant. He has circumnavigated the world twice in an electric car.

In 2011, Rafael de Mestre took part in a rally "Tesla goes east", 10,000 km through Europe from Sweden to Romania to the Black Sea with his Tesla Roadster.

He has won the following competitions:

 2011: "Tesla goes east": 10,000 km through Europe from Sweden to Romania to the Black Sea
 2014: Winner of the Swiss Energy Grand Prix
 2015: Winner of the eTourEurope
 2017: EV Trophy Winner

De Mestre organized nine international electric car races that took place in 2019 as well as the world's first 24-hour electric car race in 2018, the Eco Grand Prix.

Round-the-world trips 
In 2012, de Mestre circumnavigated the world for the first time in his Tesla Roadster and won against a French team.
In 2016 he drove around the world in 80 days.

On June 16, 2016, the second circumnavigation of the world began at the Arc de Triomf in Barcelona and ended on September 4, 2016 with his Tesla Model S.

References

External links 

 https://mestre.es/ Official website
 https://80edays.com/
 http://ecograndprix.com/
 https://ecograndprix.com/season-2023

  

1963 births
Living people
Spanish sportspeople
Spanish racing drivers
Sportspeople from Barcelona
Sports world record holders